Meteor Shower is a 2009 Chinese television series starring Hans Zhang, Yu Haoming, Vision Wei and Zhu Zixiao. It premiered on Hunan TV on August 8, 2009.

Due to the success and popularity of Japanese manga Hana Yori Dango and its franchise (Meteor Garden, Hana Yori Dango and Boys Over Flowers), Hunan TV decided to create a new series based on the same name. It is an unlicensed live-television drama production not authorized by Japanese publisher Shueisha. According to the producer, the series is only inspired by the manga and not based on it.

Synopsis

Season 1
Meteor Shower

Chu Yuxun is a poor but hardworking and studious girl. One of her biggest dreams is to enter the most prestigious school in the country, Aliston College, where only the wealthiest students can study. With help from her mother and money-loving uncle, she was enrolled into the school.

Murong Yunhai, Duanmu Lei, Shangguan Ruiqian and Ye Shuo are the four richest students of Aliston as well as the most popular students on campus. They are the idols of all of the students except for Yuxun. However, they are unsatisfied with their lives as their parents put too much pressure on them to succeed. They wish to be expelled from Aliston, and unsuccessfully perform a series of pranks to do so.

Yuxun fights for justice for the victims of the group and she becomes their instant target. Through fighting and arguing, Yunhai starts to fall in love with Yuxun but faces numerous rejections. At first, Yuxun is in love with Duanmu, but through Yunhai's persistence she agrees to start seeing him. However, Yuxun is soon blackmailed into breaking up with Yunhai by his mother, who believes that she is taking advantage of her naive son. Yunhai's mother begins to harm the people around Yuxun to threaten her into breaking up with Yunhai. Not wanting to bring harm to her friends, Yuxun has no choice but to lie to Yunhai that she still loves Duanmu. Yunhai angrily proclaims that he never wants to see her again, and becomes cold and distant towards her, focusing more on his studies in the process.

After news of his mother's involvement in the breakup reaches Yunhai, he reconnects with Yuxun through a series of incidents, and they begin dating again. However, as Yunhai is driving to Yuxun's birthday party, internal bleeding caused by a head injury he had received earlier causes him to lose his concentration and crash into a tree. At the hospital, Yunhai's mother angrily accuses Yuxun of being responsible for her son's accident; and Yuxun, feeling guilty, decides to stay away from him to grant his family some peace.

After a surgery performed by Duanmu's father, Yunhai recovers from the accident, but has lost his short-term memory, not remembering any of the people he met at Aliston. Yunhai's mother takes advantage of this and introduces the daughter of a family friend to him as his girlfriend, while Yuxun can do nothing but watch from afar. Yunhai's mother convinces the girl to take him to America with her, but she has a change of heart and tells him to stay, while she leaves. Meanwhile, Yuxun and Duanmu come up with a plan to make Yunhai gain back his memory. Yuxun rides her bicycle in front of Yunhai's car and he crashes into her, like the first time they met. As she gets up from the ground, he walks over to her, seemingly remembering who she was.

Season 2
Meteor Shower II

Murong Yunhai remembers everyone... except Chu Yuxun.
 
Every night, he dreams about a girl and then wakes up screaming from the pain of his head and the furious beating of his heart. This causes him to wonder who this girl is and why he feels lost and empty. Yunhai tells his mother about the girl in his dreams but his mother tells him not to worry and to just forget about it. He is not convinced and begs his mother to release him from home. After his mother's constant refusal, Yunhai quietly sneaks out of the house which is actually on an island. He decides to travel around the world to find this girl/shadow. After stealing his mother's platinum credit card, he decides to go to Singapore.
   
While in Singapore, he meets a new friend, Jiang Yuan, and starts falling in love with her, thinking that maybe she is the girl/shadow that he has been looking for. Jiang Yuan is very impressed by his car racing skills and slowly falls in love with him. Eventually, Jiang Yuan gives him a charm bracelet to symbolize that they are a couple. Thinking she's the one, Yunhai accepts it and wears it happily on his wrist.
 
However, when they both come back to China, Yunhai finds a furious Yuxun, who is very upset when she sees him with another girl and throws a huge tantrum in front of him. She screams his name out loud, which triggers Yunhai's memory. However, he does not believe her, and Yuxun walks away deeply hurt.

Later, the H4s are back in their dorm trying to explain who Yuxun is and how much she meant to him but he tells them that he doesn't remember anything about her. A very angry Duanmu scolds and shouts at Yunhai, telling him that if he can't remember who Yuxun is, they would never be brothers/friends again. A lost Yunhai asks him what can he do to remember. At that moment, Duanmu loses his temper and punches Yunhai right on the face with his fist. This causes Yunhai to knock his head on the staircase rail and to eventually remember everything about Yuxun: his promises with her, their fight, their bickering, their sacrifices for one another, and, most importantly, their love for each other.

Yunhai asks his brothers (H4) for help in order to win Yuxun back and for her forgiveness. Shangguan tells him an excellent plan to win Yuxun back and eventually... Yunhai and Yuxun reunites.

Cast

Main
 Zheng Shuang as Chu Yuxun
 Hans Zhang as Murong Yunhai 
 Yu Haoming as Duanmu Lei 
 Vision Wei as Ye Shuo 
 Zhu Zixiao as Shangguan Ruiqian 
 Tan Lina as Jiang Yuan

Supporting

Murong family
Wang Jianxin as Murong Zhongshi
Li Ying as Shen Hanfeng
 Xiao Han as Murong Yunduo

Students
Ren Silu as Xu Lili
Lu Hu as Guo Rongrong 
Yin Yezi as Zhao Meiran 
Chu Yihan as Jin Nana

Others
 Peng Yang as Yu Xin
 Chen Yina as Xiao Yu
Xu Yang as Chu Yuxun's mother
Li Donglin as Cai Xuechun 
Jerry Huang as Ye Mian
Zong Fengyan as Lin Xiaoli 
Ma Jianqin as Vincy
Li Shipeng as Jie Jialong
Cai Juntao as An Yuan

Soundtrack

Reception
The series attracted various controversies since its premiere. It was criticized for blatant plagiarism of Boys Over Flowers (through its Taiwanese adaptation Meteor Garden), excessive product placement, as well as its old-fashioned costumes and dialogues. Viewers also panned the inconsistent plot and poor characters development of the series. Despite the negative reviews, the series was extremely popular during its run and contributed to the rise of idol dramas in Mainland China.

Awards

Adaptation
A 52-episode animated series based on the show was produced, and premiered on Golden Eagle cartoon on 8 February 2016.

References

External links

  Official website

2009 Chinese television series debuts
Boys Over Flowers
Chinese high school television series
Hunan Television dramas
Chinese romantic comedy television series
Television series about teenagers
Television series by EE-Media